Jean-Luc Fugit is a French politician representing La République En Marche! He was elected to the French National Assembly on 18 June 2017, representing the department of Rhône.

See also
 2017 French legislative election

References

1969 births
Living people
Deputies of the 15th National Assembly of the French Fifth Republic
La République En Marche! politicians
People from Rodez
Politicians from Occitania (administrative region)
Members of Parliament for Rhône